The Hon. Abraham Elias Issa ,  (October 10, 1905 – November 29, 1984) was a Jamaican businessman, entrepreneur and hotelier acclaimed as “The Father of Jamaican Tourism”. As the first President of the Jamaica Tourist Board he guided the rise and boom in Jamaican tourism of the late 1950s.

His business accomplishments include the founding of Jamaica's first modern department store (Issa's of King Street), the country's first shopping plazas (Tropical Plaza at Half-Way-Tree and Liguanea Plazas), Jamaica's first supermarket (Hi-Lo at Cross Roads in Kingston), Jamaica's modern horse-racing track  (Caymanas Park) and being a guiding force behind the development of New Kingston, now the island's commercial center. He built Tower Isle Hotel, Jamaica's first all-season resort later evolving it into Couples Hotel, Jamaica's first all-inclusive resort and first couples only resort.

Early life

Issa was born in Kingston, Jamaica to Mary Brimo (died 1953), daughter of Damascus, Syria merchant Joseph Brimo, and Elias Abraham Issa (May 29, 1876 - September 1, 1969), son of Bethlehem, Palestine merchant Abraham Issa who immigrated to Kingston in 1894 with his son Elias. Issa's parents Elias and Mary were married on Feb 25, 1900 and the union gave birth to four children, Bertha, Abe, Joseph, and Annie.

The Issa family struggled to establish itself in Kingston. A small notions shop, opened at 32 Princess Street in 1894, failed and Abe's father and grandfather were reduced to peddling goods door to door until they could open a new shop at 27 Orange Street.  By 1900 they succeeded in bringing Abe's grandmother Sara and his father's brothers John, Antonio and Joseph to Jamaica.

In 1901 Issa's father Elias formed a partnership with his brothers as E.A. Issa & Bros. The enterprise thrived and in 1905 moved to 132 Harbour Street. The shop was destroyed in the January 14, 1907 Kingston earthquake which also took the life of Abe's Uncle Joseph.

With their goods only half insured and their books destroyed the brothers strove to recover and managed to reopen business at Penchon and Barry streets on April 4, 1907.  The business flourished and in 1911 moved to the more advantageous 135 Harbour Street then, as business grew, to the larger 153-157 Harbour Street.

Issa began his elementary education at St. Aloysius School in 1910 then went on to high school studies at St. George's College from 1918-1922.  Following a nine-month stint teaching English to South American students, he departed for Worcester, Massachusetts to begin his university education at College of the Holy Cross. In 1926 he graduated summa cum laude and delivered his valedictory address in Latin.

Career

Issa returned to Kingston in 1926 and entered the family business.  On Dec. 1930 he opened the family's first retail store, Issa's of King Street, that featured international luxury goods. By force of his personality and his insistence on quality service the business thrived.  He and his family would go on to expand their retail business opening three more shops on King Street while expanding the original store from two to four stories and introducing the first escalator in Jamaica.  In 1958 he would purchase Nathan's, the leading competitor department store.

In the early 1930s Abe traveled extensively on the business’ behalf to North America and Europe. In 1934 he traveled Japan via Russia and the Trans-Siberian Railroad and worked 14 months in Yokohama operating a factory that manufactured rubber-soled shoes.

Abe's international experiences and knowledge of luxury quality merchandise combined with his outgoing and effusive personality served him well in the family's first move outside the retail trade. On March 14, 1943 the Issa's bought the Myrtle Bank Hotel and a next door laundry from United Fruit Company for £35,000. Under Abe's guidance the hotel gained renown as a favored gathering spot of celebrities and distinguished visitors. Its guests included actor Errol Flynn, jazz great Louis Armstrong, actress Joan Crawford, Walt Disney, future Jamaican prime minister Norman Manley, future United States presidential candidate Adlai Stevenson II and British Prime Minister Winston Churchill.

Abe rose to become the Vice President of Kingston's Chamber of Commerce. In 1942 he was heralded as "Man of the Year" by Kingston's Spotlight Magazine.  The following year he made a foray into politics by forming the Jamaica Democratic Party. While the party failed to win any legislative seats in the 1944 election it began Abe's long involvement in the affairs of the soon-to-be independent nation.

Abe's boldest move came in 1948 when he built Jamaica's first all-season resort outside the then undeveloped fishing port town of Ocho Rios.  Built on a north coast cove with a small barrier reef island Tower Isle Hotel became an immediate sensation and a destination for the well-heeled and glitterati of those days.  Abe was pictured with actress Ava Gabor, boxing champion Joe Louis, actresses Debbie Reynolds, Jane Russell and Mary Martin, playwright Noël Coward, film director Cornel Lumiere, Britain's Princess Margaret, singer Lena Horne, travel writer Eugene Fodor, actor Errol Flynn and comedian Norman Wisdom.  Tower Isle's success triggered the explosion of tourist destinations on Jamaica's north coast. Frequently ahead of his time Abe rebranded Tower Isle as Couples Hotel in 1978 converting it from an all-comers hotel to Jamaica's first all-inclusive and couples-only resort, creating a business model that would be widely imitated.  The hotel remains a part of the Issa family properties as Couples Tower Isle and became the foundation property of Couples Resorts. The barrier reef island upon which a tower stands and from which the property's name derives serves as the resort's au naturel beach.

In 1955 Abe became the first President of the newly formed Jamaica Tourist Board serving in that post until 1963.  He led an aggressive international marketing campaign. Jamaican tourism grew from 86,000 tourists and £4 million in revenue in 1955 to 227,000 tourists with £38 million in revenue in 1962. In 1958 he was appointed to Jamaica's legislative council on approval by the Queen. In 1959 he was elected President of the Caribbean Tourist Association.

During this time he led his family's business expansion with the opening of the Hi-Lo at Cross Roads in Kingston, Jamaica's first super market, Caymanas Park, Jamaicas first modern horse-racing track and was a key figure in the development of New Kingston that today is Kingston's commercial and business center.  In 1961 Abe became Chief Executive of the House of Issa, the successor family entity to E.A. Issa & Bros. In 1969 the family's patriarch Elias Issa passed at age 93 leaving behind a great legacy and a memorable quote,  “Nothing shortens life like worry… my worries don’t last. I do something about them.”

On August 6, 1962 Jamaica became an independent nation and Abe played several key roles in the young nation's economic development. He served as a director of the Jamaica Industrial Development Corporation, headed the Development Finance Corporation, and its successor Jamaica Development Bank and as director of the Urban Development Corporation, where he outlined plans for cruise ship access to Kingston's harbor. He served as chairman of Jamaica Unit Trust Services Ltd. the managing company of the Jamaica Investment Fund and in 1974 served as chairman of Free Zone Promotional Council. From 1965-1972 he served as a Board Member of Air Jamaica. In 1968 he took over and turned around of the troubled assets of Runaway Bay Golf and Country Club and Runaway Bay Golf Course from Sunley Hotels Ltd. In 1973 he obtained the Hertz car rental franchise for Jamaica.

Awards

In 1960 Issa was made a Commander of the Order of the British Empire (CBE) for his contributions in the field of tourism. He was awarded the Order of Jamaica (OJ) in 1980 in recognition of his pioneering role in the development of the tourism industry in Jamaica. In 1984 he was awarded Norman Manley Award For Excellence in the Field of Tourism. In 2004 he was posthumously honored by being placed on a Jamaican postage stamp being hailed as “the Father of Jamaican tourism” for his role in the creation of the Jamaican Tourist Industry.

Personal life

While on 1931 business trip to New York City, Abe met Lorraine Shaouy, daughter of Adele Massabni and Elias Shaouy of Beirut, Lebanon,  a designer who had moved to New York in 1898 and opened design school and was later a real estate investor.  Abe and Lorraine married in Bethlehem, Palestine on Feb. 1, 1937. The couple would have six children, Carole, Brenda, the twins Suzanne and Lee (Elias), Jackie, Paul.

Abe excelled in sports as a cricketer, footballer (soccer) and tennis player.  Broadly read and widely traveled he acquired the savoir faire that provided him with the sophistication, social ease and grace that would charm and induce cooperation with the cast of celebrities, royalty, politicians and business colleagues who crossed his path in life.

Death and legacy

Issa died on November 29, 1984 following a period of terminal illness.  His life would encompass his family's rise from the death and destruction of the 1907 earthquake to its establishment of as a world renowned Jamaican business empire. It would witness Jamaican independence and economic development in which he would play the leading role in the development of the nation's most important economic asset of tourism.

His House of Issa continues on encompassing retail and hospitality industry assets led by his sons Lee Issa and Paul Issa.  His famed Tower Isle Hotel has become the anchor property of the award-winning all-inclusive resort chain Couples Resorts.  His daughter Susanne authored a pictorial biography of him with the fitting title of “Mr. Jamaica Abe Issa”.

References 

20th-century Jamaican businesspeople
1905 births
1984 deaths